Óscar Arpón Ochoa (born 9 April 1975) is a Spanish former footballer who played as an attacking midfielder, and is a current manager.

He amassed La Liga totals of 141 games and five goals over the course of seven seasons, in representation of six clubs, including Barcelona. He added 230 matches and 18 goals in Segunda División, in a senior career which spanned 18 years overall.

Club career
Born in Calahorra, La Rioja, Arpón made his professional debut in 1994–95 in the second division, with FC Barcelona B. Also, in that season's La Liga, he appeared in three matches for the main squad, being promoted roughly at the same time as Roger García.

After a move to Real Betis where he appeared sparingly, Arpón lived his most fruitful years in the top flight with Racing de Santander, contributing regularly for two consecutive mid-table positions for the Cantabrians. From then on he resumed his career in the second level, with brief passages in the first (RCD Mallorca, CA Osasuna, Recreativo de Huelva).

In August 2009, after a slow campaign with Gimnàstic de Tarragona, Arpón moved to division three, signing with modest UD Logroñés. He retired three years later, after one season in amateur football with CA River Ebro in his native region, aged 37.

Honours
Barcelona
Supercopa de España: 1994

Mallorca
Supercopa de España: 1998

Recreativo
Copa del Rey runner-up: 2002–03

Salamanca
Segunda División B: 2005–06

References

External links

Betisweb stats and bio 

1975 births
Living people
People from Calahorra
Spanish footballers
Footballers from La Rioja (Spain)
Association football midfielders
La Liga players
Segunda División players
Segunda División B players
Tercera División players
FC Barcelona Atlètic players
FC Barcelona players
Real Betis players
Racing de Santander players
RCD Mallorca players
CA Osasuna players
Polideportivo Ejido footballers
Recreativo de Huelva players
UD Salamanca players
Gimnàstic de Tarragona footballers
UD Logroñés players
Spain youth international footballers
Spain under-23 international footballers
Spanish football managers
Tercera División managers